Ostry may refer to:

Places 
Ostry, a stratovolcano in eastern Russia
Ostrý, a mountain on the Czech-German border

People 
Bernard Ostry (1927–2006), Canadian author
David Ostry, American neuroscientist
Jonathan D. Ostry (born 1962), Canadian economist
Sylvia Ostry (born 1927), Canadian economist

See also